Steel Dust was one of the founding sires of the American Quarter Horse. Very little is verifiable about his history and there is much conjecture and disagreement amongst sources.

Life

Steel Dust was foaled about 1843 in Kentucky or possibly Illinois. It is believed that he was taken to Texas in 1845 by Middleton Perry, where he was used as a utility and working cow horse, and was run in match races. Steel Dust won his most important race, held in Collin County, Texas, as a three-year-old against a horse named Monmouth. Steel Dust was later said to have been retired due to injury.

He died at the age of 32.

See also
 List of historical horses

References

American Quarter Horse sires